Newcombia canaliculata is a species of air-breathing land snail, a terrestrial pulmonate gastropod mollusk in the family Achatinellidae. This species is endemic to Hawaii.

References

C
Biota of Molokai
Molluscs of Hawaii
Endemic fauna of Hawaii
Endangered fauna of Hawaii
Gastropods described in 1905
Taxonomy articles created by Polbot